Devil's Due is a 2014 American psychological supernatural horror film directed by Matt Bettinelli-Olpin and Tyler Gillett, and written by Lindsay Devlin. The film stars Allison Miller, Zach Gilford, and Sam Anderson. The film was released on January 17, 2014.

Plot

Zach McCall and his fiancé, Samantha, decide to document their life together since Sam was orphaned as an infant, raised in foster care, and does not know much about her history or roots. After their wedding, they go to the Dominican Republic for their honeymoon. During Carnival, the couple meet a palm reader (DeMaris Gordon), who declares Sam was "born from death" and repeats to Sam that "they have been waiting" for her. Sam and Zach become disturbed, and a strange man watches them as they leave.

They get lost on the way home, and a cab driver (Roger Payano) offers to take them to a local club. There are numerous strange symbols marking the area on their way there. At the club, the same man from the fortune teller's watches them and speaks with the cab driver. Unaware they are being trapped, the couple is drugged and taken to an underground chamber beneath the nightclub, where a ritual is performed, and an unseen force fills the room.

The next morning, Zach and Sam wake in their hotel with no memory of the previous night. 
   
A few weeks after returning home, Sam discovers she is pregnant despite taking her brith control regularly. Though shocked, Zach and Samantha are overjoyed and tell their family and friends the news. The couple later attend their first ultrasound scan, where the doctor says that the baby looks healthy and Sam is due by the end of March. At that moment, the ultrasound screen goes static but recovers after a moment.

Throughout the course of her pregnancy, Sam begins to experience nosebleeds, stomach bruising, cravings for raw meat (despite being a vegetarian), superhuman strength, telekinetic abilities and unexplained feelings of rage whenever she or the baby appear to be threatened. Also, Zach and Sam continuously see strange people watching them from afar. Sam becomes convinced something is seriously wrong with the baby and that they are being watched. After a second visit to doctor, a new doctor (Robert Aberdeen) appears and performs an amnio after Sam appears nauseous. He has no answer as to the whereabouts of their original doctor, and the couple is suspicious.

Before the couple return home, a group of masked men set up hidden cameras inside their home to monitor her progress and make sure she does not hurt the baby.

When Sam is eight months pregnant, the couple attend a holy communion at their church. Their usually friendly niece (Madison Wolfe) is oddly scared of Sam now, and the priest (Sam Anderson) who officiated Zach and Sam's wedding looks at Sam during the service and violently coughs up blood. Later at home, when Zach is reviewing the communion footage he filmed, he sees the mysterious cab driver from their honeymoon sitting in a pew. He visits the priest in the hospital, who explains the symbol is related to summoning the Antichrist. He warns Zach that the symbol is the gateway for the Antichrist and that the followers of the cult will dress the house in ash to prepare for the arrival. After he finds ash all over his house (and the cops will not do anything), Zach chases the people watching their house and finds out where they are living. He asks his sister Suzie to stay with Sam while he breaks into the supposedly abandoned house at the end of his street, where the cult is staying, and there he finds the CCTV footage of his house and the missing ultrasound. He is almost caught by the cult when he goes to leave. Performing the ritual with the other cult members is the McCall's mysterious second doctor, as well as the man who has been watching their house and the cult leader (who they initially saw at the fortune teller's place and later at the club). Zach barely manages to escape.

Meanwhile, Suzie goes to check Sam, only to find that she is drawing the cult symbol before being attacked by an unseen force.

Upon returning home, Zach finds the house surrounded by the masked men who have been watching them all along. Inside, he finds Suzie dead and hears Sam scream as the house is being destroyed by some unseen force. He finds Sam in the baby's nursery standing in a trance-like state with a knife to her stomach (the knife was a mysterious gift at her baby shower). She is standing atop the cult symbol that she has carved into the floor. Zach screams for her to stop, but she presses the knife to her stomach anyway and there is a violent blast of light. When Zach recovers, he finds Sam lying in her own blood with her stomach cut. Sam cries and wonders if the baby is all right before dying in his arms. Zach breaks down in grief before the cab driver and the second doctor arrive. Zach begs the intruders to leave them alone, but the doctor takes the baby regardless. The baby glows a deep red as he takes it from Sam's body. The cult takes his camera and tapes, removing all evidence. Zach is arrested and interrogated by the police about the death of his wife and sister, and disappearance of his child, crimes for which he looks guilty.

Before the credits, the screen shows another young couple, on their honeymoon in Paris, where the same cab driver offers them a lift, hinting that the events are about to repeat all over again.

Cast
 Allison Miller as Samantha McCall
 Zach Gilford as Zach McCall
 Sam Anderson as Father Thomas
 Madison Wolfe as Brittany
 Aimee Carrero as Emily
 Vanessa Ray as Suzie
 Michael Papajohn as Police Officer
 Griff Furst as Keith
 Robert Belushi as Mason
 Donna Duplantier as Dr. Ludka

Production
On December 18, 2012, Fox announced that Matt Bettinelli-Olpin and Tyler Gillett would be directing Devil's Due, based upon a script written by Lindsay Devlin. Fox had approached the two directors (who are part of the filmmaking collective Radio Silence) based upon their short 10/31/98 in the 2012 horror anthology V/H/S.

Bettinelli-Olpin and Gillett had been approached by several other companies for "haunted house projects" but chose to work on Devil's Due over the other projects because they felt that the script was a character based "creepy mood piece" that focused on the deteriorating relationship between its two main characters. In an interview, the directors said they "focused on Zach & Samantha's love story from day one and the horror of watching the person you love degenerate, and being left helpless beyond continuing to love them unconditionally."

The script had been pitched to them as "a found-footage take on Rosemary's Baby," but the directors wanted to find ways to make their movie different from the 1968 film that they both praise and consider a personal favorite. This included instilling "a fun energy throughout" and "a sense of humor into the script."

Along with Allison Miller, Zach Gilford was announced to be in the film, which was shot during April 2013 in the Dominican Republic, New Orleans and Paris.

Bettinelli-Olpin and Gillett chose to shoot the film primarily with a Sony PMW-EX3, which they chose so that the film's actors could carry it throughout the film. The Canon 5D, Canon Vixia HF G10 and an iPhone 5 were also used in the production.

Promotion
Fox released its first trailer for the film on October 16, 2013, and a second trailer on December 5, 2013. Whereas the initial marketing campaign focused the intimate thriller aspects of the McCalls’ love story, later marketing concentrated specifically on the larger horror facets of the film.

On January 14, prior to the release of the film, Fox promoted the movie by releasing a video of footage of an animatronic baby carriage and demon baby scaring passers-by in New York City. The video went viral shortly thereafter and has had over 20 million views as of January 17, 2014.

A collector's edition of the Blu-Ray with cover art by Orlando Arocena was released in 2017 alongside 19 MGM & Fox horror films such as Carrie, Joy Ride and Black Swan.

Reception
Critical reception of Devil's Due was negative. On Rotten Tomatoes the film holds a rating of 18% based on 56 reviews, with an average rating of 4/10. The film's consensus reads: "Derivative and mostly uninspired, Devil's Due adds little to either the found-footage or horror genres that it's content to mimic." On Metacritic, the film has a score of 34 out of 100, based on 18 critics, indicating "generally unfavorable reviews".

Much of the film's criticism centered upon the film's similarity to other films such as Rosemary's Baby and Paranormal Activity, an element that Fearnet reviewer Scott Weinberg remarked was likely more due to decisions by the film's production company than anything else. Weinberg called the movie "a darkly passionate homage to Rosemary's Baby, the similarities are both intentional and affectionate," and Bloody Disgusting gave the film a favorable review, praising the acting of its lead characters, the sense of humor and drawing positive comparisons to the directors' earlier work on V/H/S.

However, since initial release the film has found a cult following and director Eli Roth has been vocal in his support of the film and in a series of posts on his official Twitter account, wrote "Don't pre-judge Devil's Due because Rosemary's Baby is a 'holy grail' movie. It's so smart, creative, inventive, and fun. Very very scary. The guys at Radio Silence killed it. Devil's Due is a legit scary, smart, horror film. So many awesome scenes. I loved it."

Use of found footage
Common criticism aimed is at the film's use of the found footage technique and asks the question "who assembled this footage?". The film's directors claimed that this was a deliberate choice, stating that "Audiences are way too smart to have the 'this is real' found footage wool pulled over their eyes anymore" and that, much like Chronicle, "Devil's Due doesn't pretend to be footage that anyone has found or compiled, it's simply a story told through cameras that exists in that world. In that sense, it's a bit of an experiment that we were able to have fun with and as the character's lives spiral out of control, we're able to mirror that journey visually by shifting to different POVs. The movie begins very bright, very intimate and full of movement, but as the watchers close in our couple we shifted to a lot more of the static cameras that exist in the world, like the security cameras, with much wider frames. We hoped to use that distance and coldness to mirror the despair and hopelessness that was tearing the couple apart." The film intentionally breaks many found footage conventions throughout, including the deliberate absence of a framing device (such as "these tapes were found by the police"), the use of an animated opening quote, a recognizable cast, a non-chronological narrative structure, and a music cue becoming the end-credits song.

Soundtrack
The film contains diagetic music from Elvis Presley, The Gaslight Anthem, Alkaline Trio, Brenton Wood, Berlin, General Public, and Laura Stevenson.

See also

 Rosemary's Baby
 Inseminoid
 The Ward

References

External links
  (archived)
 
 
 
 

2014 films
2014 horror films
2014 horror thriller films
2010s mystery films
2014 psychological thriller films
2010s pregnancy films
2010s supernatural films
20th Century Fox films
Davis Entertainment films
TSG Entertainment films
American psychological thriller films
American horror thriller films
American thriller films
American mystery films
Films directed by Matt Bettinelli-Olpin & Tyler Gillett
American supernatural horror films
American body horror films
Films set in 2013
Found footage films
American pregnancy films
American psychological horror films
Films about Satanism
Films produced by John Davis
2014 directorial debut films
2010s English-language films
2010s American films